The Greiner–Murray ministry (1988–1991) or First Greiner–Murray ministry or First Greiner ministry was the 80th ministry of the New South Wales Government, and was led by the 37th Premier of New South Wales, Nick Greiner, representing the Liberal Party in coalition with the National Party, led by Wal Murray.

The ministry covers the period from 21 March 1988 when the coalition defeated the sitting Unsworth Labor government at the 1988 state election until 6 June 1991, when Greiner reconfigured his ministry following victory at the 1991 state election.

Composition of ministry
The ministry was rearranged on four occasions.
The first rearrangement was due to the sudden death of Ray Aston in May 1988.
The second rearrangement in January 1989 was caused by the resignation of Matt Singleton from the ministry.
The third rearrangement was in September 1989.
The fourth rearrangement in July 1990 was caused by the resignation of Terry Metherell from the ministry.

 
Ministers are members of the Legislative Assembly unless otherwise noted.

See also

 Members of the New South Wales Legislative Assembly, 1988–1991
Members of the New South Wales Legislative Council, 1988–1991

Notes

References

 

New South Wales ministries
1988 establishments in Australia
1991 disestablishments in Australia